Geetashree Sandhya Mukherjee (also spelled Mukhopadhyay; 4 October 1931 – 15 February 2022) was an Indian playback singer and musician, specialising in Bengali music. She received Banga Bibhushan, the highest civilian honour of the Indian state of West Bengal in 2011. She also won the National Film Award for Best Female Playback Singer for her songs in the films Jay Jayanti and Nishi Padma in the year 1970.

Early and personal life 
Mukherjee was born in Dhakuria, Calcutta, on 4 October 1931 to Narendranath Mukherjee, a railway official, and Hemprova Devi. She was the youngest of six children. Her grandfather was a police officer, and the family had lived in Dhakuria since 1911. She was married to noted lyrist Shyamal Gupta, until his death in 2010.

Training & career
Sandhya started her music training under the direction of Pandit Santosh Kumar Basu, Professor A T Kannan, and Professor Chinmoy Lahiri. However, her guru was Ustad Bade Ghulam Ali Khan, followed by his son Ustad Munavvar Ali Khan, under whom she mastered Indian classical music. According to Manorma Sharma, "Sandhya has been able to maintain her popularity as a classical vocalist even after acquiring the gloss and the glow of playback singing ..."

Though classically trained, the bulk of her work consists of Bengali modern songs. She began her career in Mumbai singing Hindi songs, starting with a song in the film Taarana in 1950. She sang, as a playback singer, in 17 Hindi films. She decided to come back to and settle in her home city Kolkata in 1952 due to personal reasons. She married Bengali poet Shyamal Gupta in 1966. Gupta went on to write the lyrics for many of her songs.

Her best known collaboration is arguably with the Bengali singer Hemanta Mukherjee with whom she sang numerous duets, primarily as playback for Bengali films. Hemanta and Sandhya became known as the voices behind the pairings of the Bengali superstar Uttam Kumar and his numerous heroines, most notably being the actress Suchitra Sen, whose singing voice she became. Besides Hemanta Mukherjee's compositions, her largest body of work is with Robin Chattopadhyay and Nachiketa Ghosh.

During the Bangladesh Liberation War she joined the mass movement among Indian Bengali artistes to raise money for the millions of refugees who had poured into Kolkata and West Bengal to escape the fighting, and to raise global awareness for the cause of Bangladesh. She assisted Bangladeshi musician Samar Das as he set up the Swadhin Bangla Betar Kendra, the clandestine radio station broadcasting to Bangladesh and recorded several patriotic songs for him. On the occasion of the release of Sheikh Mujibur Rahman, the imprisoned leader of the new country of Bangladesh, she released a song Bangabandhu Tumi Phirey Ele. She later became one of the first foreign artists to visit Dhaka, performing at an open-air concert in Paltan Maidan in Dhaka to celebrate the first Ekushey February after Bangladeshi independence in 1971.

On 26 January 2022, on the Republic Day and a few days before testing positive for COVID-19, Mukherjee was awarded the Padma Shri for her performance in music. However, she refused the award, labelling it "disparaging and degrading". Mukherjee died of cardiac arrest and COVID-19 complications at a private hospital in Kolkata on 15 February 2022, at the age of 90.

Songs

Bengali film songs

Non-film songs

Urdu film songs

Awards

 Padma Shri in 2022 (refused)
 Banga Bibhushan in 2011.
 Bharat Nirman Award - Lifetime Achievement Award in 1999.
 National Film Award for Best Female Playback Singer for the songs "Amader Chuti Chuti" Jay Jayanti and "Ore Sakol Sona Molin Holo" Nishi Padma in 1971.
 BFJA Awards - Best Female Playback Singer for Sandhya Deeper Sikha in 1965
 BFJA Awards - Best Female Playback Singer for Jay Jayanti in 1972
 Bachsas Awards - Best Female Playback Singer for Dhire Bohe Meghna in 1973
 Honorary D.Litt. from Jadavpur University, Kolkata in 2009.
 Lata Mangeshkar Award in  1993, by Govt of Madhya Pradesh

Death 
On 27 January, Sandhya Mukherjee was admitted to SSKM Hospital with breathlessness and was later transferred to Apollo Gleneagles Hospital since she was COVID-19 positive. She also had lung infections, hypotension, ischemic heart disease, multi organ dysfunction and a fracture at her left femur. She was showing progressive improvement in her treatment, became COVID-19 negative and underwent a successful femoral surgery on 11 February. In the morning of 15 February, she was transferred to the intensive care unit for sudden severe abdominal pain and hypotension, following which she died at 7.30pm of the same day following a cardiac arrest. One of the nurses of the hospital reported that she had the cardiac arrest at the time of listening to "Ei shohor theke aro onek dure", a popular Bengali song by Manna Dey, with whom she sang numerous duets. She was cremated at the electric pyre of Keoratola crematorium with full state honours.

References

External links 

1931 births
2022 deaths
20th-century Indian singers
20th-century Indian women singers
Bengali musicians
Bengali playback singers
Bengali singers
Best Female Playback Singer National Film Award winners
Best Female Singer Bachsas Award winners
Bollywood playback singers
Indian women playback singers
Singers from Kolkata
Women musicians from West Bengal
Deaths from the COVID-19 pandemic in India